Borwick is a village and civil parish in the City of Lancaster district of Lancashire, England, about 8 miles north of Lancaster, on the Lancaster Canal.  It is situated just south of the border with Cumbria. The parish of Borwick had a population of 210 recorded in the 2001 census, decreasing to 181 at the 2011 Census.

Borwick railway station was on the former Furness and Midland Joint Railway, now Leeds to Morecambe Line, until its closure in 1960.

In film

Borwick Hall was used for the exterior scenes of the television series The Ghosts of Motley Hall, in 1977.

See also
Listed buildings in Borwick

References

External links

Villages in Lancashire
Civil parishes in Lancashire
Geography of the City of Lancaster